The State of the Black Union was an annual event in the United States to consider issues of particular relevance in the African American community, featuring prominent speakers such as John Conyers, Jesse Jackson, and Al Sharpton.

In January 2010, the founder, Tavis Smiley, announced that he was ending the event in favour of producing more programs for the Public Broadcasting Service.

Notes

African-American organizations